This is a list of bridges in India.

Historical and architectural interest bridges

Major road and railway bridges 

The largest of all indian's railway bridges is the Chenab Bridge, located on the Jammu–Baramulla line that connects the Jammu region and the Kashmir Valley, which turned out to be the most expensive line of Indian's railway network.

Extradosed bridges have experienced remarkable growth in India since the 2010s with a large number of multi-span bridges built on rivers such as the Ganges, which has significant widths in certain places. Their advantages are as follows:

 They allow longer spans than conventional beam bridges and therefore a reduced number of foundations.
 They can be made up of precast segments even for medium spans and then be erected much more quickly and easily than the typical in-situ concrete construction.
 A more elegant aesthetic appearance than conventional beam bridges.

Planned bridges

Alphabetical list

See also 

 Transport in India
 Highways in India
 List of National Highways in India by highway number
 Rail transport in India
 Geography of India
 List of rivers of India
 List of longest bridges above water in India
 List of longest bridges in West Bengal
 Bridges in Bihar
 List of bridges in Srinagar
 List of bridges on Brahmaputra River

Notes and References 
 Notes

 

 Others references

Further reading

External links